The 2021 Northern European Gymnastics Championships was an artistic gymnastics competition held in Cardiff, Wales. The event was held between the 13 November and 14 November 2021. The competition was set to be held in the same location in 2020, but was cancelled due to the COVID-19 pandemic.

Medalists

References 

Northern European Gymnastics Championships
Northern European Gymnastics Championships
Northern European Gymnastics Championships
Northern European Gymnastics Championships
Northern European Gymnastics